Thomas Thieme (born 29 October 1948) is a German actor. He is considered to be a prolific stage actor and also appeared in more than 100 film and television productions since 1973. 

In his film and television appearances, Thieme often plays powerful but morally dubious characters. He is perhaps best-known internationally for his roles as Martin Bormann in Downfall (2004) and as Communist minister Bruno Hempf in the Oscar-winning The Lives of Others, for which he was compared to Sydney Greenstreet by Roger Ebert in his review. He played former Bayern Munich boss Uli Hoeneß, who had to spent time in jail for tax evasion, in the 2015 television film Der Patriarch. He had a recurring role in the successful series Babylon Berlin as the police chief Karl Zörgiebel.

Filmography

References

External links
 

1948 births
Living people
Actors from Weimar
German male film actors
German male television actors
21st-century German male actors